is a village located in Yoshino District, Nara Prefecture, Japan.  It is the largest village in Japan in terms of area. As of January 2017, the village has an estimated population of 3,488 and a density of 5.2 persons per km2. The total area is 672.35 km2.

History
In 1889, a major flood happened in Totsukawa, causing widespread destruction. In result, many citizens moved to Hokkaido and developed a new village there. It was named “Shintotsukawa”, meaning “New Totsukawa" .

Geography

Climate
Totsukawa has a humid subtropical climate (Köppen climate classification Cfa), which is hot and humid in the summer (above ) and is somewhat cold in the winter with temperatures dropping to around freezing

Demographics
Per Japanese census data, the population of Totsukawa in 2020 is 3,061 people. Totsukawa has been conducting censuses since 1920.

Landmarks

 Tanize Suspension Bridge (谷瀬の吊り橋): a suspension bridge known for the Yuredaiko, an annual drum festival on the bridge.
Sasanotaki (笹の滝): a waterfall listed on the 100 best waterfalls in Japan. 
 Tamaki Shrine (玉置神社): a Shinto shrine located at the top of Mt. Tamaki built by the Emperor Sujin in 37 BC and is surrounded by many big cedar trees. Tamaki Shrine is registered with the UNESCO World Heritage Centre as part of the "Sacred Sites and Pilgrimage Routes in the Kii Mountain Range." 
Tosenji Onsen (湯泉地温泉): a hot spring listed on the 100 best hot springs in Japan.

Transportation
Totsukawa is served by National Routes 168 and 425. The nearest major train station is Hashimoto Station in Wakayama Prefecture.

Sister cities
Yatsushiro, Kumamoto
Miyoshi, Tokushima

References

External links

 Totsukawa Village web page (in Japanese)

Villages in Nara Prefecture